Wintergreen, written in 1987, is a book by Robert Michael Pyle.  It describes the devastation caused by unrestrained logging in Washington's Willapa Hills.  It was also the winner of the John Burroughs Medal for Distinguished Nature Writing.

Environmental non-fiction books
1987 non-fiction books
1987 in the environment